CRRC Zhuzhou Locomotive Co., Ltd. is one of the electric locomotive manufacturers in China. It is one of the subsidiaries of CRRC.

History

Predecessor

Zhuzhou Electric Locomotive Works was founded in 1936.

CRRC Zhuzhou Locomotive Co., Ltd.
On 31 August 2005, CSR Group Zhuzhou Electric Locomotive Co., Ltd. was spin-off from the locomotive works; the original legal entity of the locomotive works became an intermediate holding company for CSR Group only. After the formation of listed company CSR Corporation Limited, the limited company "CSR Group Zhuzhou Electric Locomotive" became part of the listed portion of the group, and the intermediate holding company remained unlisted. The limited company also renamed to CSR Zhuzhou Electric Locomotive Co., Ltd.,

In 2015 the company was renamed into CRRC Zhuzhou Locomotive Co., Ltd..

Joint ventures
Siemens Traction Equipment Ltd. (STEZ), is a joint venture between Siemens (50%), Zhuzhou CRRC Times Electric (30%) and CRRC Zhuzhou Locomotive (20%). It produces AC drive electric locomotives and AC locomotive traction components.

In September 2012, CSR Zhuzhou Locomotive agreed to build a factory at Batu Gajah in Malaysia.

It also has different joint ventures established with Siemens to build metro cars for the Guangzhou Metro Line 3, and to deliver 180 new HXd1 BoBo+BoBo EuroSprinter-based freight locomotives.

Products

Electric locomotives
 Shaoshan series electric locomotives
 SS1 inspired from USSR (archived) and French locomotive 6Y2
 SS3 inspired from Japanese locomotive
 SS4
 SS5
 SS6 - SS6B
 SS8
 SS9
 VVVF control electric locomotives
 DJ "Gofront"
 DJ1
 DJ2 "Olympic Stars"
 HXD1 licensed from Siemens
 HXD1B
 HXD1C
 HXD1D
 HXD1G
 Export products
 TM1 (Iran)
 TM2 (Iran)
 TM3 (Iran)
 O’ Z-Y type electric locomotive (Uzbekistan)
 KZ4A (Kazakhstan)

Inter City commuter
 DJJ1 "Blue Arrow" (archived)
 DJJ2 "China Star"  (archived)
 CJ6 
 Changsha–Zhuzhou–Xiangtan intercity railway
KTM Class 92 (Malaysia)
KTM Class 93 (Malaysia)
 MŽ 411 for Macedonian Railways
 TFR Class 20E AC/ DC electric locomotives (South Africa)
 Leo Express
 East Coast Rail Line (Malaysia)

Metro
 Shanghai Metro (Line 1 (1st Generation), Line 2, Line 4, Line 11, Line 16, Line 18)
 Guangzhou Metro (Line 2, Line 3, Line 7, Line 8, Line 9, Line 14, Line 21)
 Shenzhen Metro (Line 1, Line 2, Line 5, Line 8,  Line 11, Line 16 )
 Wuhan Metro Type B cars(Line 1, Line 2, Line 4); Type A cars (Line 6, Line 7, Line 8 and Line 11) at Jiangxia District near Wuhan. Yangluo line will use the same Type A cars.
 Ningbo Rail Transit lines 1, 2, 3, 4 and 5
 Kunming Rail Transit lines 1, 2, 3 and 6
 Zhengzhou Metro lines 1, 2 and 5
 Rapid Metro Gurgaon
 Changsha Metro lines 1, 2, 3 and 4
 Wuxi Metro line 1
 Lahore Metro Orange Line, trains are each composed of five wagons and are automated and driverless. A standard Chinese "Type B" train-set consisting of 5 cars with 4 doors each used, that has a stainless steel body and illuminated by LED lighting. Each car has a nominal capacity of 200 seated and standing passengers at an average density of 5 persons per square metre with 20% of passengers seated and 80% standing. A total of 27 trains with 135 cars have been ordered for the system,  at a cost of $1 billion. A total of 54 trains are expected to be in service by 2025. The trains powered by a 750-volt third rail.
 Nanning Rail Transit lines 1 & 2
 Ürümqi Metro line 1
 Istanbul Metro Line 11
 Ankara Metro lines 1 & 4
 Navi Mumbai Metro Line 1
 Metrorrey MM-20 series mixed-use trains, for lines 1, 2 and 3, sharing the same railways with previous Concarril/Bombardier MM-90X series, CAF's MM-93, Bombardier's MM-05 and SIEMENS-Duewag MM-80 (refurbished SIEMENS-Duewag U3 series trains from Frankfurt Metro).
 Mexico City Metro future line 1 trains, part of a contract involving the construction of 30 trains (with 28 being built at El Rosario complex), also including the complete overhaul of line 1 with the aid of Coalvi and Thales Group (which will provide the CBTC system, signalling equipment and originally the digitalisation of part of the PCC1 equipment regarding line 1 operation, with an uncertain future due to the January 9 fire that made the control center a total loss due to fire damage).

LRV
 Izmir Metro Line 1
 Kuala Lumpur LRT Line 3, Line 4 and Line 11
 Huai'an tram, China
 Shenzhen tram, China
 Auto City tram T1 LRV in Wuhan - 21 cars with Siemens

Maglev
 Changsha Maglev

References

External links

  

 
Zhuzhou Locomotive
Manufacturing companies based in Hunan
Vehicle manufacturing companies established in 2005
Chinese companies established in 2005
Zhuzhou